Haroon Rashid may refer to:

People
 Harun al-Rashid (763/766–809), fifth Arab Abbasid Caliph from 786–809
 M Harunur Rashid (archaeologist) (1925–2010), Bangladeshi archaeologist
 Harunur Rashid Khan Monno (1932–2017), Bangladeshi industrialist and politician
 A. M. Harun-ar-Rashid (1933-2021), Bangladeshi physicist
 Haroon al Rasheed (born 1935), Pakistani Sufi
 Harun-ar-Rashid, Bangladeshi politician from Comilla District
 Harun Aur Rashid Khan, Bangladeshi politician from Chittagong District
 Harun-or-Rashid (police officer)
 M Harunur Rashid (born 1939), Bangladeshi writer
 Mohammad Harun ar Rashid, Bangladeshi politician from Dhaka District
 Haroon Rasheed (born 1953), Pakistani cricketer
 SM Haroon-or-Rashid (born 1962), Bangladeshi dramatist and journalist
 Harunur Rashid (cricketer) (born 1968), Bangladeshi cricketer
 Harunur Rashid, Bangladeshi politician from Lakshmipur District
 Haroon (singer) (born 1973), Pakistani pop musician
 Haroon Rashid Aswat (born 1979), British Islamist
 Harunur Rashid (filmmaker), Bangladeshi film director and writer
 Harunur Rashid (Chapai Nawabganj politician), Bangladeshi politician from Chapai Nawabganj District
 Haroon Rashid (chemist), Pakistani academic and administrator 
 Harun Rashid Khan, Indian banker
 Harunur Rashid Khan, Bangladeshi politician from Chandpur-3
 Harunur Rashid, Bangladeshi politician from Chandpur-4
 M Harun-Ar-Rashid, Bangladeshi Army officer
 Harun-or-Rashid, Bangladeshi university administrator and academic

Other uses
 Harun al Raschid (film), a 1924 Austrian film directed by Michael Curtiz
 Al-Rashid Billah the 12th-century Caliph of Baghdad from 1135 to August 1136.

See also
 The Gift of Harun Al-Raschid, a 1924 poem by William Butler Yeats
 Haruna (disambiguation)